Hal Moore (August 23, 1923 – March 31, 2003) was an American wrestler. He competed in the men's freestyle featherweight at the 1948 Summer Olympics.

References

1923 births
2003 deaths
American male sport wrestlers
Olympic wrestlers of the United States
Wrestlers at the 1948 Summer Olympics
People from Osage County, Oklahoma